The Diocese of Evinayong is a Latin Church ecclesiastical jurisdiction or diocese of the Catholic Church in Equatorial Guinea. It is a suffragan diocese in the ecclesiastical province of the metropolitan Archdiocese of Malabo, yet depends on the missionary Roman Congregation for the Evangelization of Peoples.

Its cathedral is the Catedral de San José, dedicated to Saint Joseph, in the episcopal see of Evinayong, capital of Centro Sur province, Región Continental.

History 
Established in 2017.04.01 as Diocese of Evinayong (Spanish) / Evinayongen(sis) (Latin), on territory split off from the Diocese of Bata (in the same ecclesiastical province).

Episcopal ordinaries
Bishops of Evinayong
 Calixto Paulino Esono Abaga Obono (2017.04.01–Present)

See also 
 List of Catholic dioceses in Equatorial Guinea

Sources and external links 
 GCatholic with Google satellite photo - data for all sections

Roman Catholic dioceses in Equatorial Guinea